Janette Husárová and Magdaléna Rybáriková were the defending champions but decided not to participate.
Andrea Hlaváčková and Lucie Hradecká won the title, defeating Nina Bratchikova and Anna Tatishvili in the final, 6–4, 6–1.

Seeds

Draw

Draw

References
 Main Draw

Budapest Grand Prix - Doubles
2013 Doubles